Keith Bennett (קית' בנט; born April 19, 1961) is an American-Israeli former basketball player. He played the guard and forward positions. He played 10 seasons in the Israel Basketball Premier League.

Biography

Bennett was born and raised in Stamford, Connecticut. He is 6' 5" (1.97 meters) tall. 

He attended Westhill High School. Bennett was named to the 1978–79 New Haven Register All-State boys basketball team, and 1978–79 All-Fairfield County Interscholastic Athletic Conference.

Bennett attended Sacred Heart University, and played for the Sacred Heart Pioneers. In 1983 he became the school's leading career scorer.  He was named a National Association of Basketball Coaches Division II All-American in 1981, 1982, and 1983, and Regional Player of the Year in 1982 and 1983.

He was drafted in the 1983 NBA Draft in Round 7, Pick 156, by the New Jersey Nets.

Bennett played 10 seasons in the Israel Basketball Premier League for Hapoel Ramat Gan, Hapoel Jerusalem, Hapoel Tel Aviv, Hapoel Holon, Ironi Nahariya, and Hapoel Givatayim.

References 

1961 births
Living people
Sportspeople from Stamford, Connecticut
Israeli men's basketball players
Hapoel Tel Aviv B.C. players
Hapoel Jerusalem B.C. players
Hapoel Holon players
American men's basketball players
Israeli American
Hapoel Ramat Gan Givatayim B.C. players
Ironi Nahariya players
Sacred Heart Pioneers men's basketball players